The Ram Range is a mountain range of the Canadian Rockies located in David Thompson Country, Canada.  The range extends southeast from Abraham Lake to the Ram River.  It is bounded on the southwest by Whiterabbit Creek.

This range includes the following mountains and peaks:

External links 

Ram Range on Bivouac.com

Mountain ranges of Alberta
Ranges of the Canadian Rockies